Jean-Michel Byron (born Jean-Michel Byron DuPlessis) is a South African-born funk and rock vocalist. The singer-songwriter is best known for serving for a time as the lead vocalist for the rock band Toto for new material on their first greatest hits album, Past to Present, as well as the band's Greatest Hits Live...and More project. Byron was the fourth frontman in the band's history, replacing Joseph Williams after Williams had suffered from voice issues due to intense touring as well as drug abuse. The South African singer was pushed heavily by the group's record label. The line-up change divided Toto's band-members, yet key group member Jeff Porcaro expressed support at first. His tenure with the band ended up being both brief and highly controversial with fans. In more recent years, Byron has collaborated with the jazz fusion group Michael Sanders & the One Tribe Nation.

Biography and career
Byron's musical career began in 1983 as a session singer, having also played in groups doing cover songs. Originally from East London, South Africa, he attended high school (senior secondary) at John Bissicker High School in a former "coloured area". He sang at high school concerts and community shows.

Byron joined Toto for their Past to Present 1977–1990 album. Singing on the release's four new tracks, including the funk-fueled song "Love Has the Power", Byron had a style mixing rock music with R&B different than the group's past vocalists, being directly influenced by artists such as George Michael. The album proved to be a hit after it came out in mid-1990, reaching top 20 spots on album ranking charts in over four nations including Germany and Switzerland, and it also attracted critical praise. Reviewers had mixed remarks on Byron's vocal abilities, with AllMusic's William Ruhlmann finding the artist "more soulful than his predecessors, but no more memorable."

The band's record label had strongly pushed Byron on the other band members, who felt uncertain given the difference of styles between Byron's soul music background and Toto's previous rock work. Despite album success, things would soon become more intense. During the album's supporting tour in 1990, Byron and the band began to openly clash. His on-stage antics and diva-like behavior irked other band members and had a strongly polarizing influence on Toto's fans, some concertgoers even flipping him off and heckling him during performances. "Byron comes out and starts dancing around. I’m looking at Jeff [Porcaro] with bulging eyes. In rehearsal, Byron was just sitting there, but now he's out doing this Michael Jackson on crack shit, with a golf glove on one hand, and my jaw was on the floor," Toto guitarist, songwriter, and co-vocalist Steve Lukather later remarked, "We’re mortified... but it had all gone to his head".

The group ended up bringing in additional singers, and Steve Lukather took on a more prominent role until Byron ended up being basically relegated to the role of a backing vocalist. Upon Byron's dismissal, Toto were once again at a crossroads, having had an acrimonious divide during his tenure.

Fans' anti-Byron sentiment had built up to the point that all of his songs were cut from the filmed Toto Live video from the aforementioned tour, though his studio work has remained a hot topic among critics and listeners alike over the years. After being kicked out of Toto, Byron released a solo album, simply titled Byron, which contains an alternate version of "Love Has the Power"

More recently, Byron has collaborated with the group "Michael Sanders & the One Tribe Nation", a band playing a mix of jazz rock with funk, world music, and more, and he appeared on the outfit's 2005 debut album Servants of a Lesser God. With Byron's material alongside works by Luis Conte and Andy Vargas of Santana among others, the release has received positive remarks from several critics such as Morley Seaver of antimusic.com, who praised the "hypnotic blend of musical virtuosity and melodic ear-pleasers" on the album.

Byron also contributed to the Star Jasmine Music Foundation project's 2007 release, titled simply Star Jasmine, with his material alongside songs performed by artists such as Ginger Baker and Van Morrison. His song was called "For a Dancer". The charitable organization assists Californians in many ways such as operating "JAMS", a volunteer-run music school giving instruments and lessons to at-risk youths in the Santa Barbara area.

In 2021 he was on the jury for the regional finals of the Italian music talent format Sanremo Rock, during which he performed in a live jam session with Nora Hime, art name of Eleonora Almonti, front of the winning Italian band Tothem.

Highlighted discography 
1990 – Past to Present / Toto (vocals, composition)
2005 – Servants of a Lesser God / Michael Sanders & the One Tribe Nation (vocals)

References 

Year of birth missing (living people)
Living people
20th-century South African male singers
Toto (band) members
21st-century South African male singers